Pianos I Have Known is a 15-minute British television programme which aired on the BBC during 1958 for a total of three episodes. It was among a number of programmes aired which featured piano teacher and broadcaster Sidney Harrison.

Episode list
Piano with Candles (28 January 1958)
Piano in the Pit (11 February 1958)
Concert Grand (25 February 1958)

References

External links
Pianos I Have Known on IMDb

1950s British music television series
1958 British television series debuts
1958 British television series endings
BBC Television shows
Black-and-white British television shows